The ASEAN Intergovernmental Commission on Human Rights (AICHR) was inaugurated in October 2009 as a consultative body of the Association of Southeast Asian Nations (ASEAN). The human rights commission exists to promote and protect human rights, and regional co-operation on human rights in the member states of (Brunei Darussalam, Cambodia, Indonesia, Laos, Malaysia, Myanmar, Philippines, Singapore, Thailand and Vietnam). The AICHR meets at least twice per year.

Human rights are referenced in the ASEAN Charter (Articles 1.7, 2.2.i and 14) and other key ASEAN documents. The commission operates through consultation and consensus—each of the 10 member states has veto power. The commission makes no provision for independent observers.

The AICHR is directed by a body of representatives, one per member state, each nominated by and answerable to their government and serving a three-year term, renewable once. The commission has 14 mandates, mainly around the promotion and protection of human rights, capacity building, advice and technical assistance, information gathering and engagement with national, regional, and international bodies. One of its mandates was "to develop an ASEAN Human Rights Declaration", but when this was adopted, in November 2012, it came under criticism from human rights groups for including wording that suggested that access to human rights was contingent on "the performance of corresponding duties as every person has responsibilities to all other individuals, the community and the society where one lives". NGOs in the region presented cases of alleged violations to it at its inaugural meeting in Jakarta.

The commission has been described as "toothless" by observers including The Wall Street Journal. The ASEAN chair at the time of AICHR's founding, Abhisit Vejjajiva, said that "...the commission's 'teeth' would be strengthened down the road", but six years after AICHR's founding, critics charge that "...since it was launched,...[AICHR] has yet to take any action to safeguard the most basic freedoms of citizens it supposedly represents."

AICHR Commission members

2009-2012

2013-2015

See also 

 ASEAN Commission on the Promotion and Protection of the Rights of Women

References

Further reading

External links
Website of the AICHR
Development of the ASEAN Human Rights Mechanism Directorate-General for External Policies of the European Parliament 2012

ASEAN
Intergovernmental human rights organizations